Justin Francis is a Los Angeles-based film director and photographer.

Notable work
Francis has directed music videos for Alicia Keys, Skip Marley, Jidenna, Carly Rae Jepsen, Santana, Wyclef, Kimbra, Pia Mia, B.o.B, Weezer, The Fray, Kelly Clarkson, Nicole Scherzinger, Modest Mouse, Young the Giant, Demi Lovato, Jessica Sanchez, Amos Lee, Timbaland, Mariah Carey, Bonnie McKee, Trey Songz, Jaguar Wright, Obie Trice, Cashis, Kill Hannah, Dropping Daylight, and Busta Rhymes (co-directed with Benny Boom).

As part of The Saline Project, Justin has also co-directed videos for Eminem, 50 Cent, Gwen Stefani, The Black Eyed Peas, The Roots, The Hives, The Cure, Keane, Mobb Deep, Daddy Yankee, Young Buck, Sugarcult, The Mars Volta, Demi Lovato and Nappy Roots.

Francis's work with Alicia Keys on "Unbreakable" won "Outstanding Video" at the 37th NAACP Image Awards. His video for the Alicia Keys song "No One" was granted "Best R&B Video" at the 2008 MVPA Awards.

In addition to directing music videos and commercials, Francis has undertaken photography projects all over the world. He shot publicity photos for The Roots to promote their album, The Tipping Point. His photos have been featured on album covers and distributed internationally on records, CDs, and posters.

Francis also served as the Director of Photography's apprentice under Matthew Libatique on the film Requiem for a Dream (2000).

References

External links 
 Justin Francis official website
 

American music video directors
American cinematographers
Living people
Year of birth missing (living people)
Place of birth missing (living people)
Participants in American reality television series